Danggu (Geikie) Gorge National Park is a national park in the Kimberley region of Western Australia,  (great-circle distance) northeast of Perth and approximately  east of Broome by road.
The gorge was originally named in honour of Sir Archibald Geikie, the Director General of Geological Survey for Great Britain and Ireland when it was given its European name in 1883. Geikie never visited the gorge and the National Park is progressively being officially changed to the Bunubathe traditional owners of the areaname of Danggu. It is part of the  Balili (Devonian Reef) Conservation Park.

The park is one of the most accessible in the Kimberley as it is only  from Fitzroy Crossing and is serviced by a sealed road. No camping is allowed in the park and visitors can only enter during the day. The park has picnic shelters, barbecue areas, toilets and water available.

A  walk trail exists along the western base of the gorge walls; although the terrain is rough and uneven it does offer an excellent view. The eastern side of the gorge is closed to visitors as it is a nature preserve. Tour boats also operate in the gorge and a boat ramp is available for the public to use. Hours of use of the boat ramp are restricted to outside of boat tour times.

The flood level can be clearly seen on the walls where the abrasive action of the floodwaters on the limestone has scoured the surface white.

The limestone was originally a reef formed not by corals but by algae and lime secreting organisms that are now extinct. Fossils from the Devonian can be found within the limestone strata.

The river water sustains an abundance of life, including barramundi, sawfish and freshwater crocodiles, all of which can be found in the gorge.

The vegetation that fringes the river bank includes river gums, freshwater mangroves, pandanus, cadjeput and native figs. Dense banks of reeds are also found along the banks. The flora provides a suitable habitat for a range of fauna, including fruit bats, lilac-crowned wren, reed warbler and the great bowerbird.

See also

 Protected areas of Western Australia
 Kimberley (Western Australia)

References 

National parks of Western Australia
Kimberley (Western Australia)
Protected areas established in 1967
Kimberley tropical savanna